Yumi Tsukirino (born January 5, 1950) is a Japanese manga artist born in Saitama Prefecture. Representative works are Magical Pokémon Journey and Fluffy, Fluffy Cinnamoroll. Nicknamed YOji, she previously used the pen name  (which is pronounced the same as her current name but uses different Japanese characters). 

In addition to creating the art for the OSTER project albums, she has also created art for singles such as Miracle Paint.

Awards 
 37th , girl/ladies department

List of works

Serialised 
  (Shōgaku Sannensei September 2007 – March 2008, Shōgaku Gonensei May 2005 – February 2007)
  (Putchi-gumi Vol. 9 – Vol. 11)
  (published in Shōgaku Ninensei April 2009 – July 2009, Shōgaku Sannensei October 2008 – August 2009, Shōgaku Yonensei May 2008 – July 2009 and Shōgaku Gonensei June 2008 – July 2009)

Short stories 
  (debut work in Ciao March 1996)
  (Ciao DX supplementary spring 1996 issue)
  (Ciao DX supplementary summer 1996 issue)
  (extra issue included with Ciao in September 1996)
  (Ciao January 1997)
  (Ciao DX supplementary winter 1997 issue)
  (Ciao May 1997)
  (Ciao DX supplementary autumn issue 2000)
  (Ciao DX supplementary spring issue 2001)
  (Ciao DX supplementary summer 2001 issue)
  (Ciao DX supplementary autumn issue 2001)
  (Ciao DX supplementary winter issue 2001)
  (Ciao DX supplementary spring issue 2002)
  (Ciao DX supplementary summer issue 2002)
  (Ciao DX supplementary winter issue 2003)
  (Ciao DX supplementary early summer issue 2003)
  (Ciao DX supplementary summer issue 2003)
  (Ciao DX supplementary autumn issue 2003)
  (Ciao DX supplementary summer issue 2006)

Animated series 
  (in charge of storyboards since the episode aired in April 2008)

Paperback volumes 
 Magical Pokémon Journey (as ): 10 volumes (published by Shōgakukan under the brand Flower Comics Special)
  (as ): 3 volumes (published by Shōgakukan under the brand Flower Comics)
  (as ): 1 volume (published by Shōgakukan in May 2002 under the brand Flower Comics)
  (as ): 1 volume (published by Shōgakukan in October 2003 under the brand Flower Comics)
 : 5 volumes (published by Shōgakukan under the brand Tentōmushi Comics)
 : 3 volumes (published by Shōgakukan under the brand Pikkapika Comics)
 : 2 volumes (published by Shōgakukan under the brand Tentōmushi Comics Special)

Non-Japanese publications 
Her Magical Pokémon Journey has been partially published in the US by Viz Media, in Singapore in English by Chuang Yi, in Germany by Egmont Manga & Anime and in France by Glénat. Fluffy, Fluffy Cinnamoroll has also been published in English by VizKids.

Her Stitch! manga has been published in the US by Tokyopop.

References

External links 

 
Magical Pokémon Journey Website (Archive)
PiPiPi Website:Japanese
 Yumi Tsukirino manga, manga2 at Media Arts Database 

Manga artists
Living people
1950 births